Monster Surf is a Gary Hoey album released on June 21st. 2005. It consists of 14 instrumental tracks, 11 of which are cover versions of surf music hits. Dick Dale, the track's original composer, makes a guest appearance on "Misirlou".

Track listing
Pipeline 3:11 (The Chantays cover)
Hawaii Five-O 2:31 (The Ventures cover)
California Dreamin' 2:37 (The Mamas & the Papas cover)
Fun, Fun, Fun 3:02 (The Beach Boys cover)
Peter Gunn 2:41 (Henry Mancini's cover)
Surfin' U.S.A. 2:48 (The Beach Boys cover)
Walk Don't Run 3:09 (The Ventures cover)
Penetration 2:47 (The Ventures cover)
Baja 3:27 (The Surfaris cover)
Gone Surfin' 3:15
Misirlou 3:06 (Dick Dale cover)
Wipe Out 3:33 (The Surfaris cover)
Grog Stomp 2:12
Namotu Moon 2:58

2005 albums
Gary Hoey albums
Surfdog Records albums